Bjendag Gewog (Dzongkha: སྦྱེད་ནག་) is a gewog (village block) of Wangdue Phodrang District, Bhutan.

Wache Dzong is located here.

References 

Gewogs of Bhutan
Wangdue Phodrang District